Hisaralan can refer to the following villages in Turkey:

 Hisaralan, Dazkırı
 Hisaralan, Ezine
 Hisaralan, Sındırgı